Olswang was an international law firm headquartered in London, United Kingdom and with additional offices in Reading, Brussels, Madrid, Paris, Singapore and, since 2011, Munich. It worked closely with a network of firms across eighty countries. The Lawyer ranked the firm 22nd largest in the UK by worldwide turnover in 2010. That year, the firm had over 600 staff, including 97 partners. David Stewart was the firm's chief executive. On 1 May 2017, Olswang merged with CMS Cameron McKenna and Nabarro to form  CMS Nabarro Olswang LLP.

The firm's main practice areas included media, technology, telecommunications, real estate, corporate, intellectual property, commercial litigation and arbitration, finance, leisure, tax, EU and competition, and employment.

History 
Olswang was founded in 1981 by Simon Olswang and Mark Devereux, who was the firm's senior partner.  as a breakaway from property law firm Brecher & Co. Its early reputation was primarily based on film and media work. The firm grew rapidly through the 1990s, developing more of a focus on technology as well as media. In common with other professional service firms, Olswang converted to a limited liability partnership status under English law with effect from 1 May 2009.

Olswang merged with CMS Cameron McKenna LLP and Nabarro LLP on 1 May 2017 with the name CMS Cameron McKenna Nabarro Olswang LLP.

Olswang brought libel actions against Bill Browder on behalf of Pavel Karpov of the Russian interior ministry, over the Magnitsky story

Main areas of practice 
 Commercial litigation & arbitration
 Corporate
 Employment
 EU & competition
 Finance
 Intellectual property (IP)
 Leisure
 Life sciences
 Media
 Real estate
 Tax
 Technology
 Telecommunications

References

External links 
 
 
 Olswang's rankings in Chambers UK, Chambers Europe and the Chambers Student Guide

Law firms of the United Kingdom
Intellectual property law firms
Patent law firms
Law firms based in London
Law firms established in 1981
1981 establishments in England